The Worldwide Developers Conference (WWDC) is an information technology conference held annually by Apple Inc. The conference is usually held at Apple Park in California. The event is usually used to showcase new software and technologies in the macOS, iOS, iPadOS, watchOS, and tvOS families as well as other Apple software. WWDC is also an event hosted for third-party software developers that work on apps for iPhones, iPads, Macs, and other Apple devices. Attendees can participate in hands-on labs with Apple engineers and attend in-depth sessions covering a wide variety of topics.

The first ever WWDC was held in 1983, with the introduction of Apple Basic, but it was not until 2002 that Apple started using the conference as a major launchpad for new products. Beginning in 1987, WWDC was held in Santa Clara. After 15 years in nearby San Jose, the conference moved to San Francisco, where it eventually became Apple's primary media event of the year and regularly sold out. WWDC returned to San Jose 13 years later.

WWDC 2020 and WWDC 2021* were hosted as online-only conferences due to the COVID-19 pandemic. WWDC22 invited developers and press back into Steve Jobs theater for the first time in about three years despite the COVID-19 pandemic. Customers and consumers watched the event via an online live streams. All of these events were hosted at Apple Park in Cupertino, California.

*WWDC21 had an outdoor viewing for select developers and press.

Attendance

A $1,599 ticket is required to enter the conference. Tickets are obtained through an online lottery. Scholarships are available for students and members of STEM organizations. Attendees must be 13 years or older and must be a member of an Apple Developer program.

Until 2007, the number of attendees varied between 2,000 and 4,200; however, during WWDC 2007, Steve Jobs noted that there were more than 5,000 attendees. The WWDC events held from 2008 to 2015 were capped, and sold out at 5,000 attendees (5,200 including special attendees). WWDC 2018 had 6,000 attendees from 77 countries, including 350 scholarship recipients.

Content
WWDC is held annually from Monday to Friday on one week in June. The conference consists primarily of a keynote address, presentation sessions, one-on-one "lab" consultations, and special get-togethers and events.

The conference begins with a Monday morning keynote address by Tim Cook and other Apple executives. (From 1998 until his resignation and death in 2011, Steve Jobs gave the keynote address, which the media often called the Stevenote.) It is attended by both conference attendees and the media, since Apple regularly makes product announcements at the event. Hardware announced during the address is sometimes exhibited in the conference hall afterwards. The keynote address is followed in the afternoon by a Platforms State of the Union address, which highlights and demonstrates changes in Apple's software developer platforms that are detailed in sessions later in the week. The Apple Design Awards are also announced on the first day of the conference.

Several session tracks run simultaneously from Tuesday through Friday. The presentations cover programming, design, and other topics and range from introductory to advanced. Almost all regularly scheduled presentations are delivered by Apple employees. These presentations are streamed live, and recordings can be viewed on demand on the Apple Developer website in the conference's iOS and tvOS applications. Lunchtime sessions are given by a variety of guest speakers who are industry experts in technology and science; these sessions are not streamed or recorded. In the past, some sessions included question-and-answer time, and a popular Stump the Experts session featured interaction between Apple employees and attendees.

At the labs, which run throughout the week, Apple engineers are available for one-on-one consultations with developers in attendance. Experts in user interface design and accessibility are also available for consultations by appointment.

Apple organizes social get-togethers during the conference for various groups, such as women in technology or developers interested in internationalization or machine learning. The Thursday evening Bash (previously the Beer Bash) at a nearby park features live music, food, and drinks for all attendees 21 years or older.

History

1980s

1983 
In 1983, the first WWDC was held. During this time, the event was called The Apple Independent Software Developers Conference. Participants of the event had to sign an NDA, so not much is known about the event, but what is known is that people got a first look at Lisa, the world's first personal computer with a graphical interface.

1984 
In 1984, Jobs introduced the famous Macintosh, the second graphical interface personal computer, to developers. This was also the first year the conference was open to the media.

1989 
In 1989, System 7 was announced.

1990s

1991 
In 1991, WWDC saw the first public demonstration of QuickTime.

1995 
In 1995, WWDC'95 focused almost fully on the Copland project, which by this time was able to be demonstrated to some degree. Gil Amelio stated that the system was on-schedule to ship in beta form in later summer with an initial commercial release in the very late fall. However, very few live demos were offered, and no beta of the operating system was offered.

1996 
In 1996, WWDC'96's primary emphasis was a new software component technology called OpenDoc, which allowed end users to compile an application from components offering features they desired most. The OpenDoc consortium included Adobe, Lotus, others, and Apple. Apple touted OpenDoc as the future foundation for application structure under Mac OS. As proof of concept, Apple demonstrated a new end-user product called Cyberdog, a comprehensive Internet application component suite offering users an integrated browser, email, FTP, telnet, finger and other services built fully of user-exchangeable OpenDoc components. ClarisWorks (later renamed AppleWorks), a principal product in Apple's wholly owned subsidiary Claris Corporation, was demonstrated as an example of a pre-OpenDoc component architecture application modified to be able to contain functional OpenDoc components.

1997 
In 1997, WWDC marked the return of Steve Jobs as a consultant, and he reacted for an insult by a developer. WWDC'97 was the first show after the purchase of NeXT, and focused on the efforts to use OPENSTEP as the foundation of the next Mac OS. The plan at that time was to introduce a new system then named Rhapsody, which would consist of a version of OPENSTEP modified with a more Mac-like look and feel, the Yellow Box, along with a Blue Box that allowed extant Mac applications to run under OS emulation. The show focused mainly on the work in progress, including a short history of development efforts since the two development teams had been merged on February 4. Several new additions to the system were also demonstrated, including tabbed and outline views, and a new object-based graphics layer (NSBezier).

1998 
In 1998, in response to developer comments about the new operating system, the big announcement at WWDC'98 was the introduction of Carbon, effectively a version of the classic Mac OS API implemented on OpenStep. Under the original Rhapsody plans, classic applications would run in sandboxed installation of the classic Mac OS, (called the Blue Box) and have no access to the new Mac OS X features.  To receive new features, such as protected memory and preemptive multitasking, developers had to rewrite applications using the Yellow Box API. Developer complaints about the major porting effort to what was then a shrinking market and warnings that they might simply abandon the platform, led Apple to reconsider the original plan. Carbon addressed the problem by dramatically reducing the effort needed, while exposing some of the new functions of the underlying OS. Another major introduction at WWDC'98 was the Quartz imaging model, which replaced Display PostScript with something akin to display PDF. Although the reasons for this switch remain unclear, Quartz also included better support for the extant QuickDraw model from the classic OS, and (as later learned) Java2D. Supporting QuickDraw directly in the graphics model also led to a related announcement, that the Blue Box would now be invisible, integrated into the extant desktop, instead of a separate window.

1999 
In 1999, WWDC'99 was essentially a progress report as the plans outlined in WWDC'98 came to fruition. Three major announcements were the opening of the operating system underlying the new OS as Darwin, improvements to the Macintosh Finder, and the replacement of QuickDraw 3D with OpenGL as the primary 3D API. The system formerly named OpenStep, and during development termed Yellow Box, was formally renamed Cocoa. 2,563 developers attended.

2000s

2000 
WWDC 2000 was another "progress report" before the upcoming release of Mac OS X. Recent changes included a modified dock and improved versions of the developer tools. Developer Preview 4 was released at the show, with the commercial release pushed back to January 2001. Also, WebObjects was dropped in price to a flat fee of US$699. Approximately 3,600 developers attended and the band The Rippingtons played at the Apple campus.

2001 
In 2001, Mac OS X had only recently been released, but WWDC'01 added the first release of Mac OS X Server and WebObjects 5. Over 4,000 developers attended, and leather jackets with a large blue "X" embroidered on the back were distributed to attendees.

2002 
In 2002, Mac OS X v.10.2, QuickTime 6 and Rendezvous (now named Bonjour) were presented. Apple also said farewell to Mac OS 9 with a mock funeral, and told the developers that no more Mac OS 9 development would occur, reinforcing that the future of the Mac was now entirely on Mac OS X, thus shutting down the Classic Mac OS operating system.

2003 
In 2003, WWDC 2003 demonstrated the Power Mac G5, previewed Mac OS X Panther (10.3), announced the launch of Safari 1.0 (concluding its beta phase), and introduced  the iApps: iPhoto, iMovie, iDVD, etc. Attendees received Apple's first model of the iSight web camera (to coincide with the launch of iChat AV), pre-releases of Mac OS X 10.3 and Mac OS X 10.3 Server, the O'Reilly book Cocoa in a Nutshell, and a 17-inch notebook carry bag. Apple also screened the Pixar film Finding Nemo for attendees, ahead of its premiere in cinemas. Formerly scheduled for May 19 to 23 in San Jose, California, WWDC 2003 was rescheduled for June 23 to 27 at San Francisco's Moscone Center. Approximately 3,000 developers attended.

2004 
In 2004, WWDC was held from June 28 to July 2. Jobs noted that 3,500 developers attended, a 17% increase from 2003. New displays were introduced in 23- and 30-inch widescreen. Mac OS X Tiger (10.4) was previewed and iTunes 4.9, the first version with integrated podcast support, was demoed by Jobs. All attendees received a developer preview of Tiger, a grey T-shirt with the Apple logo on the front and "WWDC 2004" on the back, a backpack able to hold a 17-inch PowerBook, and a copy of Apple Remote Desktop 2.0. The band Jimmy Eat World played at the Apple campus after attendees were taken there by bus from Moscone Center West.

2005 
WWDC 2005 was held from June 6 to 10. After a basic market update, Jobs announced that Apple would transition the Mac to Intel processors. The keynote featured developers from Wolfram Research, who discussed their experience porting Mathematica to Mac OS X on the Intel platform. The conference consisted of 110 lab sessions and 95 presentation sessions, while more than 500 Apple engineers were on site alongside 3,800 attendees from 45 countries. The band The Wallflowers played at the Apple campus.

2006 

In 2006, Jobs once again delivered the keynote presentation at the WWDC, which was held from August 7 to 11 in Moscone Center West, San Francisco. The Mac Pro was announced as a replacement to the Power Mac G5, which was Apple's prior pro desktop computer and the last remaining PowerPC-based Mac. The standard Mac Pro featured two 2.66 GHz dual core Xeon (Woodcrest) processors, 1 GB RAM, 250 GB hard drive, and a 256 MB video card. An Xserve update, based on the dual core Xeons, was also announced. Redundant power and Lights Out Management were further product improvements to Apple's server lineup. While certain key Mac OS X improvements were undisclosed, there were 10 improvements in the next iteration, Mac OS X Leopard (10.5), including: full 64-bit app support, Time Machine, Boot Camp, Front Row, Photo Booth, Spaces (Virtual Desktops), Spotlight enhancements, Core Animation, Universal Access enhancements, Mail enhancements, and Dashboard enhancements (including Dashcode, and iChat enhancements). Along with the Leopard features that were announced, a major revision to the Mac OS X Server product was announced. New features to the Server included: a simplified set-up process, iCal Server (based on the CalDAV standard), Apple Teams (a set of web-based collaborative services), Spotlight Server, and Podcast Producer. The 2006 WWDC attracted 4,200 developers from 48 countries, while there were 140 sessions and 100 hands-on labs for developers. More than 1,000 Apple engineers were present at the event, and the DJ BT performed at the Apple Campus in Cupertino.

2007 
WWDC 2007 was held from June 11 to 15 in Moscone Center West, and started with a keynote presentation from Jobs. Apple presented a feature-complete beta of Mac OS X Leopard, even though its release date was pushed back to October. Jobs announced that a version of Safari, Apple's proprietary web browser, had been created for Windows, and that a beta release was being made available online that same day. Apple also announced support for third-party development of the then-upcoming iPhone via online web applications running in Safari on the handset. The announcement implied that Apple, at least for the time being, had no plans to release an iPhone software development kit (SDK), meaning that developers must use standard web protocols. Also, Jobs noted during the keynote that more than 5,000 attendees were present at WWDC 2007, breaking the prior year's record. The band Ozomatli played at the Yerba Buena Gardens.

2008 
In 2008, WWDC 2008 took place from June 9 to 13 in Moscone Center West. Apple reported that, for the first time, the conference had sold out. There were three tracks for developers, iPhone, Mac, and IT. Announcements at the keynote included the App Store for iPhone and iPod Touch, the stable version of the iPhone SDK, a subsidized 3G version of the iPhone for Worldwide markets, version 2.0 of iPhone OS, Mac OS X Snow Leopard (10.6), and the replacement/rebranding of .Mac as MobileMe. Seven years later, Yahoo News would describe 2008 as "perhaps the peak year for WWDC product intros", which however was marred by problems with MobileMe that caused "one of the biggest PR disasters in Apple history". For the bash held June 12, the band Barenaked Ladies played at the Yerba Buena Gardens.

2009 
In 2009, WWDC 2009 took place from June 8 to 12 in Moscone Center West, and Apple reported that the 2009 conference sold out in late April. Announcements at the keynote included the release of the iPhone OS 3.0 software announced to developers in March, a demonstration of Mac OS X Snow Leopard (10.6), the new 13" MacBook Pro, updates to the 15" and 17" MacBook Pros, and the new iPhone 3GS. Phil Schiller, Apple's SVP for Product Marketing, presented the WWDC keynote this year, instead of Jobs, who had taken medical leave of absence since the start of the year. Attendees received a neoprene messenger bag and the band Cake played at the Yerba Buena Gardens. This was the first year plastic badges were used instead of printed paper badges.

2010s

2010

WWDC 2010 was announced on April 28, 2010 and held at Moscone Center West from June 7 to 11. Apple reported that the conference was sold out within 8 days of tickets being made available, even though tickets were only available at the full price of US$1599 (2009 and prior, tickets could be bought with an early-bird discount of US$300). On June 7, 2010, Jobs announced the iPhone 4, whose technical problems, combined with Jobs blaming phone owners for them, would dominate the aftermath of the conference ("Antennagate"). Also at WWDC 2010, the renaming of iPhone OS to iOS was announced. The FaceTime and iMovie app for iPhone applications were also announced. The band OK Go played at the Yerba Buena Gardens. Attendees received a black track jacket with the letters "WWDC" across the vest and the number "10" stitched on the back.

2011

WWDC 2011 was held in Moscone Center West from June 6 to 10, 2011. The event reportedly sold out within just 12 hours of the 5,000 tickets being placed on sale on March 28, 2011. The ticket price also remained the same from the 2010 WWDC, selling at US$1,599, however, after-market pricing for tickets ranged from US$2,500 to US$3,500. At the keynote, Apple unveiled its next generation software: Mac OS X Lion, the eighth major release of Mac OS X; iOS 5, the next version of Apple's advanced mobile operating system which powers the iPad, iPhone and iPod Touch; and iCloud, Apple's upcoming cloud services offering. Michael Franti and Spearhead played at the Bash in Yerba Buena Gardens on June 9. Attendees received a black track jacket similar to that of the prior year, but with a smaller "WWDC" across the front and the number "11" stitched on the back. This was the final Apple event hosted by Jobs.

2012

WWDC 2012 was held in Moscone Center West from June 11 to 15. The ticket price remained the same as the 2010 WWDC, selling at US$1,599. Apple changed the purchasing process by requiring purchases to be made using an Apple ID associated with a paid Apple developer account. Tickets went on sale shortly after 8:30am Eastern Time on Wednesday April 25, 2012, and were sold out within 1 hour and 43 minutes. The keynote highlighted the launch of Apple Maps, and also announced new models of the MacBook Air, and MacBook Pro including one with Retina Display. Apple also showcased OS X Mountain Lion and iOS 6.

In prior years, attendees were required to be at least 18 years old. In 2012, Apple changed this requirement to at least 13 years after a minor who was "accidentally" awarded a student scholarship in 2011 successfully petitioned Tim Cook to retain the award. Despite the change, Beer Bash attendees were still required to be 18 years old, and 21 years old to consume alcohol, in accord with local and federal laws. Neon Trees performed at the WWDC Bash.

2013

In 2013, WWDC 2013 was held from June 10 to 14, 2013 in Moscone Center West. Tickets went on sale at 10am PDT on April 25, 2013, selling out within 71 seconds (1 minute and 11 seconds). Apple also announced that it would award 150 free WWDC 2013 Student Scholarship tickets for young attendees to benefit from the conference's many workshops.

In the keynote, Apple unveiled redesigned models of the Mac Pro, AirPort Time Capsule, AirPort Extreme, and MacBook Air, and showcased OS X Mavericks, iOS 7, iWork for iCloud, and a new music streaming service named iTunes Radio. Vampire Weekend performed at the Bash on June 13 at the Yerba Buena Gardens.  Attendees received a black wind breaker with the letters "WWDC" across the front and the number "13" stitched on the back.

2014

WWDC 2014 was held from June 2 to 6, 2014 in Moscone Center West. For the first time, the opportunity to buy tickets was given at random to developers who were members of an Apple developer program at the time of the conference announcement, and who registered at Apple's developer web site. Apple also gave 200 free Student Scholarship tickets. The keynote began on June 2 and Apple unveiled several new software items, including iOS 8—the largest update to iOS since the release of the App Store—and OS X Yosemite, which features a redesigned interface inspired by iOS. Announcements included the new programming language Swift, many developer kits and tools for iOS 8, but no new hardware. Bastille performed at the Yerba Buena Gardens, and attendees received a black windbreaker with the letters "WWDC" across the front and the number "14" stitched on the back, along with a US$25 iTunes gift card to commemorate the 25th anniversary of WWDC.

2015

WWDC 2015 was held from June 8 to 12, 2015 in Moscone Center West in San Francisco. The major announcements were the new features of iOS 9, the next version of OS X called OS X El Capitan, the first major software update to the Apple Watch, the June 30 debut of Apple Music, and news that the language Swift was becoming open-source software supporting iOS, OS X, and Linux. The Beer Bash was held at the Yerba Buena Gardens on June 11. Walk the Moon performed there.

2016

WWDC 2016 was held from June 13 to June 17, 2016 at the Bill Graham Civic Auditorium and Moscone Center West in San Francisco. The announcements at the event included renaming OS X to macOS, the new version named macOS Sierra, as well as updates to iOS 10, watchOS 3, and tvOS 10. Apple proclaimed that the keynote would be the largest ever for developers; this became the reality when they allowed third-party developers to extend the functionality in Messages, Apple Maps, and Siri. Cisco Systems and Apple announced a partnership at the 2016 WWDC. Cisco APIs, accessed through Cisco DevNet, were to have greater interoperability with Apple iOS and APIs.

The keynote was more about software updates and features, as no new hardware was introduced. Apple released the Home App that works with HomeKit as a control center for all third-party applications which provide functions for the home. Also, Swift Playgrounds was announced as an iPad exclusive app that helps younger people learn to code with Apple's programming language Swift. APFS, Apple's new file system, was introduced.

The Bash was performed by Good Charlotte at the Bill Graham Civic Auditorium.

2017

WWDC 2017 (stylized as WWDC17) was held from June 5 to June 9, 2017 at the San Jose Convention Center in San Jose, California, which was the first time since 2002 that the conference took place in the city. Software announcements included iOS 11, watchOS 4, macOS High Sierra, and tvOS 11. Hardware announcements included updates to iMac, MacBook and MacBook Pro, as well as the new iMac Pro, 10.5-inch iPad Pro and smart speaker HomePod. Fall Out Boy performed at the Bash held in Discovery Meadow on June 8.

2018

WWDC 2018 was held from June 4 to June 8, 2018, at the San Jose Convention Center in San Jose, California. The announcements at the event included iOS 12, macOS Mojave, watchOS 5, and tvOS 12. As with 2016, there were no new hardware announcements. Panic! at the Disco performed at the Bash at Discovery Meadow Park.

2019 
WWDC 2019 was held from June 3 to June 7, 2019 at the San Jose Convention Center in San Jose, California. The announcements at the event included iOS 13, macOS Catalina, watchOS 6, tvOS 13, iPadOS 13, the 3rd generation Mac Pro, and the Pro Display XDR. Weezer performed at the Bash at Discovery Meadow Park.

2020s

2020 
WWDC 2020 was held from June 22 to June 26, 2020 as an online-only conference for the first time because of the ongoing COVID-19 pandemic. The announcements at the online Apple Special Event included iOS 14, iPadOS 14, watchOS 7, tvOS 14, macOS Big Sur, and Apple's transition to custom ARM processors for their Macintosh family of personal computers, including a prototype ARM-based Mac for developer use. The event video footage was recorded at Apple Park in Cupertino, California. In total, the event got over 22 million views with around 72 hours of content.

2021 
WWDC 2021, with the tag line "Glow and behold.", was held from June 7 to June 11, 2021 as another online-only conference due to the COVID-19 pandemic. iOS 15, iPadOS 15, watchOS 8, tvOS 15, macOS Monterey, and other software updates were announced. There were no new hardware announcements at the conference. As with 2020, the event video footage was recorded at Apple Park in Cupertino, California.

2022 
WWDC 2022, with the tagline "Call to code.", was held from June 6 to June 10, 2022 as another online-only conference due to the COVID-19 pandemic despite improvements, just like the previous two held in 2020 and 2021, although there was a special day at Apple Park on June 6, allowing developers and students to watch the online events together. Despite the COVID-19 pandemic, the event also occurred as an in-person conference for the first time since the previous one held in 2019. iOS 16, iPadOS 16, watchOS 9, tvOS 16 and macOS Ventura were announced at the conference. Stage Manager for Macs was also introduced during the initial presentation. Hardware announcements included the M2 chip and updated MacBook Air and 13-inch MacBook Pro models based on it.

Related events
Several third-party conferences are held in conjunction with WWDC each year, including AltConf, Layers, and NextDoor. Prominent podcasters Jim Dalrymple and John Gruber hold events nearby, and former Apple evangelist James Dempsey performs a benefit concert.

Previously, Apple also announced new products at Macworld Expo and Apple Expo.

See also

 Apple Inc. advertising
 Apple Music Festival
 Google I/O
 Microsoft Build
 List of Apple Inc. media events

References

External links

 

 
Recurring events established in 1983
1983 establishments in California
June events